John Plumb (23 February 1846 – 21 July 1891) was a pastoralist and politician in the Colony of New South Wales.

He was born near Goulburn to farmers Robert and Elizabeth Plumb. He attended Goulburn Grammar School and Calder House Academy in Redfern, and became a sheep farmer. He also had interests in mining and contracting. In 1889 he was elected to the New South Wales Legislative Assembly as one of two Free Trade members for Carcoar, serving until his defeat in 1891. Plumb died a month later at Woollahra.

References

 

1846 births
1891 deaths
Members of the New South Wales Legislative Assembly
Free Trade Party politicians
19th-century Australian politicians